Cheilocostus is a genus of flowering plant in the family Costaceae, with the type species C. speciosus.  Databases are currently (September 2020) inconsistent, with some botanists preferring to place the five species in the genus Hellenia.

Species
The Plant List lists five accepted species:
 Cheilocostus borneensis A.D.Poulsen 
 Cheilocostus globosus (Blume) C.D.Specht 
 Cheilocostus lacerus (Gagnep.) C.D.Specht 
 Cheilocostus sopuensis (Maas & H.Maas) C.D.Specht 
 Cheilocostus speciosus (J.Koenig) C.D.Specht

References

External links
 
 

Costaceae